Rosendal Township is a township in Griggs County, North Dakota, United States.

Demographics
Its population during the 2010 census was 35.

Location within Griggs County
Rosendal Township is located in Township 148 Range 61 west of the Fifth principal meridian.

References

Townships in Griggs County, North Dakota